New Albany is an unincorporated community located within Cinnaminson Township in Burlington County, New Jersey, United States.

References

Cinnaminson Township, New Jersey
Unincorporated communities in Burlington County, New Jersey
Unincorporated communities in New Jersey